Jusufi (derived from the Arabic Yusuf) is an Albanian surname and the name of the following persons:

 Fahrudin Jusufi (born 1939), Serbian football player
 Sascha Jusufi (born 1963), Serbian football player
 Pëllumb Jusufi (born 1988), Albanian football player
 Alban Jusufi (born 1981), Albanian football player
 Rexhep Jusufi (died 1943), Albanian Soldier of the Balli Kombëtar Movement

Albanian-language surnames
Patronymic surnames
Surnames from given names